Borodayevka is a rural locality (a selo) in Lemeshkinskoye Rural Settlement, Rudnyansky District, Volgograd Oblast, Russia. The population was 253 as of 2010. There are 3 streets.

Geography 
Borodayevka is located in steppe, on the Khopyorsko-Buzulukskaya Plain, 24 km north of Rudnya (the district's administrative centre) by road. Lemeshkino is the nearest rural locality.

References 

Rural localities in Rudnyansky District, Volgograd Oblast